Dimitri Diatchenko (April 11, 1968 – April 21, 2020) was an American actor.

Life and career 
Diatchenko was born April 11, 1968, in Oakland, California. He was a native of San Francisco, California and a first-generation American; his father is Ukrainian and his mother was of Greek and Swedish descent. Diatchenko began classical guitar lessons at the age of seven. Two years later, he gave his first solo classical guitar recital. During and after his studies, Dimitri Diatchenko won several medals in guitar competitions including the Stotsenberg International Classical Guitar Competition or the World Championships of Performing Arts. He released four solo guitar CDs.

Diatchenko studied martial arts from the age of seven. He earned black belts in both Tae Kwon Do and Kenpo Karate and studied boxing and arnis. During the early 1990s, Dimitri Diatchenko competed as a heavyweight in several national championships, winning many medals in full contact fighting, including the US Olympic Festival, the WTF National Championships and The 1991 World Invitational in Miami, Florida.

Diatchenko attended Newton North High School in Newton, Massachusetts where Matt LeBlanc also attended at the same time and later Stetson University in DeLand, Florida. There he was a scholarship music student, majored in classical guitar, and received a Bachelor of Music degree. After transferring to Florida State University in Tallahassee, Dimitri Diatchenko continued with acting and music studies in the Masters program. In April 1996, as Dimitri Diatchenko was graduating, he was cast in Ridley Scott's 1997 action film G.I. Jane and landed a small role as trainee; following this, Dimitri Diatchenko relocated to Los Angeles to pursue his acting career. In Los Angeles, he also taught guitar privately and performed regularly as a soloist and ensemble player.

Dimitri Diatchenko made appearances in several television series. After appearing in the action series Alias, he was in the films Indiana Jones and the Kingdom of the Crystal Skull and Get Smart.

For his performance as Ukrainian tour guide Yuri in the film Chernobyl Diaries, Diatchenko received positive reviews from some film critics.

In addition to acting, Diatchenko worked as voice actor. He lent his voice to a lot of video and computer games. His first performance in a video game came in 2005 with additional voices for Medal of Honor: European Assault.

Animal cruelty charge 
In 2015, Diatchenko pleaded no contest to animal cruelty after allegedly cooking and eating his ex-girlfriend's pet rabbit. He was sentenced to three years probation and ordered to perform sixty days of community labor and undergo forty-eight hours of counselling.

Death 
Diatchenko died in his home in Daytona Beach, Florida, on April 21, 2020, ten days after his 52nd birthday. He was discovered two days later after a wellness check initiated by concerned relatives. According to Diatchenko's agent, the death appeared to be a heart attack or complications from an electric shock Diatchenko had sustained at work a week before his death. An autopsy later revealed that there was a large amount of fentanyl and Valium in his system and the medical examiner listed the official cause of death as an accidental overdose of prescription drugs.

Filmography

Film

Television

Video games

Awards and nominations

Music 
2003: Instrumental and Acting Grand Champion of the World at the World Championships of Performing Arts

References

External links 
 

Male actors from San Francisco
American male film actors
American male television actors
American male video game actors
American male voice actors
American people of Ukrainian descent
American people of Greek descent
American people of Swedish descent
Place of death missing
2020 deaths
20th-century American male actors
21st-century American male actors
Newton North High School alumni
American Kenpo practitioners
Drug-related deaths in Florida
1968 births